North Beach Haven is an unincorporated community and census-designated place (CDP) located within Long Beach Township, in Ocean County, New Jersey, United States. As of the 2010 United States Census, the CDP's population was 2,235.

Geography
According to the United States Census Bureau, the CDP had a total area of 1.831 square miles (4.740 km2), including 1.815 square miles (4.700 km2) of land and 0.016 square miles (0.040 km2) of water (0.85%).

Demographics

Census 2010

Census 2000
As of the 2000 United States Census there were 2,427 people, 1,208 households, and 735 families living in the CDP. The population density was 535.5/km2 (1,388.3/mi2). There were 5,850 housing units at an average density of 1,290.7/km2 (3,346.3/mi2). The racial makeup of the CDP was 98.56% White, 0.29% African American, 0.21% Asian, 0.41% from other races, and 0.54% from two or more races. Hispanic or Latino of any race were 2.76% of the population.

There were 1,208 households, out of which 13.3% had children under the age of 18 living with them, 51.5% were married couples living together, 7.5% had a female householder with no husband present, and 39.1% were non-families. 35.3% of all households were made up of individuals, and 20.2% had someone living alone who was 65 years of age or older. The average household size was 2.01 and the average family size was 2.55.

In the CDP the population was spread out, with 12.7% under the age of 18, 4.4% from 18 to 24, 18.8% from 25 to 44, 28.6% from 45 to 64, and 35.5% who were 65 years of age or older. The median age was 56 years. For every 100 females, there were 89.2 males. For every 100 females age 18 and over, there were 87.4 males.

The median income for a household in the CDP was $44,643, and the median income for a family was $55,833. Males had a median income of $41,071 versus $32,361 for females. The per capita income for the CDP was $29,752. About 5.3% of families and 5.8% of the population were below the poverty line, including 9.3% of those under age 18 and 5.1% of those age 65 or over.

Climate

According to the Köppen climate classification system, North Beach Haven, New Jersey has a humid subtropical climate (Cfa) with hot, moderately humid summers, cool winters and year-around precipitation. Cfa climates are characterized by all months having an average mean temperature > 32.0 °F (> 0.0 °C), at least four months with an average mean temperature ≥ 50.0 °F (≥ 10.0 °C), at least one month with an average mean temperature ≥ 71.6 °F (≥ 22.0 °C) and no significant precipitation difference between seasons. During the summer months in North Beach Haven, a cooling afternoon sea breeze is present on most days, but episodes of extreme heat and humidity can occur with heat index values ≥ 95 °F (≥ 35 °C). During the winter months, episodes of extreme cold and wind can occur with wind chill values < 0 °F (< -18 °C). The plant hardiness zone at North Beach Haven Beach is 7a with an average annual extreme minimum air temperature of 4.3 °F (-15.4 °C). The average seasonal (Nov-Apr) snowfall total is between 12 and 18 inches (31 and 46 cm), and the average snowiest month is February which corresponds with the annual peak in nor'easter activity.

Ecology

According to the A. W. Kuchler U.S. potential natural vegetation types, North Beach Haven, New Jersey would have a dominant vegetation type of Northern Cordgrass (73) with a dominant vegetation form of Coastal Prairie (20).

References

Census-designated places in Ocean County, New Jersey
Jersey Shore communities in Ocean County
Long Beach Island
Long Beach Township, New Jersey